Wanq'uni (Aymara wanq'u guinea pig, -ni a suffix to indicate ownership, "the one with guinea pigs", also spelled Huankhuni) is a  mountain in the Chilla-Kimsa Chata mountain range in the Andes of Bolivia. It lies in the La Paz Department, Ingavi Province, at the border of the Guaqui Municipality and the Jesús de Machaca Municipality. Wanq'uni is situated northeast of Tanka Tankani and southeast of Quta Willk'i.

References 

Mountains of La Paz Department (Bolivia)